Ramachandran Ramesh (born  20 April 1976), also known as R. B. Ramesh, is an Indian chess grandmaster from Chennai who won the 2002 British Championship and the 2007 Commonwealth Championship.

He is married to WGM Aarthie Ramaswamy.  They are India's first Grandmaster couple.

He started Chess Gurukul, Chess Academy in Chennai to train young players in 2008. Since then, Chess Gurukul has produced many international chess champions from India, including Bharath Subramaniyam, who became an International master in 2019 at the age of 11 years and 8 months.

Ramesh shot to fame with his commentary in the World Chess Championship Match 2013 Anand - Carlsen, where he was the official commentator along with GM Susan Polgar.

References

External links
 
 

1976 births
Living people
Indian chess players
Chess grandmasters
Tamil sportspeople